"Sweet, Sweet Blues" is an episode of the NBC drama series In the Heat of the Night, starring Carroll O'Connor as Chief Bill Gillespie and Howard Rollins as Detective Virgil Tibbs. In the Heat of the Night was based on the 1965 novel by John Ball, which was also the basis for the Academy Award winning film of the same name starring Sidney Poitier and Rod Steiger, directed by Norman Jewison.

Synopsis
Directed by Vincent McEveety (Firecreek) and written by William James Royce, the episode guest stars musician Bobby Short as bluesman Chester "Ches" Collins and actor James Best as Nathan Bedford. The story revolves around the forty-plus-year-old, unsolved racially motivated murder of Sergeant Willson Sweet's grandfather, Louis Sweet, a story loosely based on the 1963 murder of Mississippi civil rights activist Medgar Evers. Although the crime went unsolved and the elder Sweet's body was never found, there was a witness, a young black man named Ches Collins. Ches is determined to see that justice is done, even if it has been delayed all these years.

On several occasions he notices young Sweet (Geoffrey Thorne) come into the night club where he plays to hear him sing "The Bad Sweet Blues", a song he wrote about the incident. The tune supposedly tells the story of what happened to Sweet's grandfather, and mentions the names of people who were responsible for the crime they committed and were now either dead, or close to it. The song, written by series star Carroll O'Connor and performed by Bobby Short, begins Sweet's heroic quest to see that justice is served before the aging murderer of his grandfather is allowed to pass away, taking his secret with him.

Most notable was the name of one of the characters in the episode, the retired sheriff, Nathan Bedford. He was purposely given that name by Royce because a Confederate general and the first Grand Wizard of the Ku Klux Klan, was named Nathan Bedford Forrest. In the episode, Nathan Bedford, in the twilight of his years, regretted his involvement in the lynching of Sweet's grandfather and sought peace and forgiveness for his past actions from God, even though he was not the gunman - however, he was there and took part. The trigger man was a man named Delbert Mueller, who was dying in a local hospital. Mueller admits to Chief Gillespie on his deathbed that the story about Louis Sweet's disappearance that was originally told was, in fact, a lie, but wouldn't implicate himself being involved. After investigating various clues and finally learning the complete story and the location of his grandfather's remains from Collins, Sweet confronts Bedford at the end of the episode. He informs the older man that he now knows the truth, and is aware of his complicity in his grandfather's murder, which leaves Bedford visibly shaken.

That season, In the Heat of the Night won its first NAACP Image Award for Outstanding Dramatic Series and James Best won the Crystal Reel Award for Best Actor.

Production notes
The inspiration for the episode is taken from the true life story of civil rights activist Medgar Evers who was murdered in front of his home in Jackson, Mississippi on June 12, 1963.  Although it was widely known that Evers was shot by white supremacist and Klansman Byron De La Beckwith, in 1991, when this story was written, Beckwith had apparently gotten away with murder.

In 1994, thirty years after the two previous trials had failed to reach a verdict, De La Beckwith was again brought to trial based on new evidence, and Bobby DeLaughter took on the job as the prosecutor. An aging Klansman who had heard De La Beckwith brag about the killing felt compelled, after all these years, to come forward and give testimony in a court of law. De La Beckwith was convicted of murder on February 5, 1994, after having lived as a free man for much of the three decades following the killing. He appealed, unsuccessfully, and died in prison at the age of 80, in January 2001.

In popular culture 

The Medgar Evers story has inspired numerous works of art, including literature, music, and film, helping to assure that his legacy endures.

Musician Bob Dylan wrote his 1963 song "Only a Pawn in Their Game" about the assassination of Medgar Evers. On August 28, 1963, at the historic “March on Washington,” Dylan sang “Only A Pawn in Their Game” at the Lincoln Memorial – where Dr. Martin Luther King made his famous “I Have A Dream” speech.

Medgar's widow, Myrlie Evers co-wrote the book For Us, the Living with William Peters in 1967. This book is the basis for the 1983 award-winning PBS biopic.

For Heat actor Howard Rollins, this was the second project relating to the slain civil rights worker. In 1983, Rollins starred in For Us the Living: The Medgar Evers Story, a made-for-television biopic that aired on PBS's American Playhouse. The movie won the prestigious Writers Guild of America award for Best Adapted Drama, and netted Rollins the NAACP Image Award for Outstanding Actor in a Drama Series in 1983.

In 1996, director Rob Reiner's film Ghosts of Mississippi was released. The film, starring Alec Baldwin, Whoopi Goldberg and James Woods, details the 1994 trial and subsequent conviction of Beckwith.

References

External links 
 
 New York Times Feb. 2, 1994

1991 American television episodes
Television episodes directed by Vincent McEveety